The 2011 New Mexico State Aggies football team represented New Mexico State University in the 2011 NCAA Division I FBS football season. The Aggies were led by third–year head coach DeWayne Walker and played their home games at Aggie Memorial Stadium. They are members of the Western Athletic Conference. They finished the season 4–9, 2–5 in WAC play to finish in seventh place.

Schedule

References

New Mexico State
New Mexico State Aggies football seasons
New Mexico State Aggies football